Mahesh Bhupathi and Leander Paes were the defending champions, but did not participate together. Paes played with Tomáš Cibulec but they lost in the semifinals to Mark Knowles and Daniel Nestor. Bhupathi partnered with Max Mirnyi but they lost in semifinals to Paul Haarhuis and Yevgeny Kafelnikov.

Haarhuis and Kafelnikov went on to win the title, defeating Knowles and Nestor 7–5, 6–4 in the final.

Seeds

Main draw

Finals

Top half

Section 1

Section 2

Bottom half

Section 3

Section 4

References

External links
Association of Tennis Professionals (ATP) – main draw
2002 French Open – Men's draws and results at the International Tennis Federation

Men's Doubles
French Open by year – Men's doubles